George Robert Hobart-Hampden, 5th Earl of Buckinghamshire (1 May 1789 – 1 February 1849), known as George Hobart until 1816, was a British peer and politician.

Background
Buckinghamshire was the son of the Hon. George Vere Hobart, second son of George Hobart, 3rd Earl of Buckinghamshire. His mother was Jane, daughter of Horatio Cattaneo, while Robert Hobart, 4th Earl of Buckinghamshire, was his uncle.

Political career
Lord Buckinghamshire sat briefly as Member of Parliament for Mitchell (also known as the St Michaels constituency) from 1812 to 1813. In 1816 he succeeded his uncle in the earldom and entered the House of Lords. In 1824 he assumed by Royal licence the additional surname of Hampden.

Personal life
Lord Buckinghamshire married Anne, daughter of Sir Arthur Pigot, in 1819. They had no children. He died in February 1849, aged 59, and was succeeded by his younger brother, the Reverend Augustus Edward Hobart-Hampden. Lady Buckinghamshire later remarried and died in May 1878.

References

External links 
 

1789 births
1849 deaths
5
Members of the Parliament of the United Kingdom for constituencies in Cornwall
UK MPs 1812–1818
UK MPs who inherited peerages
George